is a 1982 Japanese drama film directed by Mitsuo Yanagimachi. It was entered into the 32nd Berlin International Film Festival.

Cast
 Jinpachi Nezu as Yukio Yamazawa
 Kumiko Akiyoshi as Junko
 Jirō Yabuki as Akihiko Yamazawa (as Jirō Yabuki)
 Miyako Yamaguchi as Fumie Yamazawa
 Gō Awazu as Driver
 Sumiko Hidaka as Ine Yamazawa
 Yudai Ishiyama as Manager
 Keizō Kanie as Daijin
 Nenji Kobayashi as Farmer
 Kōjirō Kusanagi as Takejirō Yamazawa
 Seiji Matsuyama as Fumie's brother
 Yuichi Minato as Office worker
 Aoi Nakajima as Fumiko
 Rei Okamoto as Taiwanese woman
 Kiminobu Okumura as Koichirō Yamazawa

References

External links

1982 films
1982 drama films
Japanese drama films
1980s Japanese-language films
Films directed by Mitsuo Yanagimachi
1980s Japanese films